Beyond the Door is the seventh album by American rock band Redd Kross, released in 2019 on Merge Records. It features guest appearances by former Redd Kross member Gere Fennelly, Buzz Osborne of The Melvins and Josh Klinghoffer of Red Hot Chili Peppers, plus songs written with Anna Waronker and Kim Shattuck. Redd Kross new members include drummer Dale Crover (The Melvins) and guitarist Jason Shapiro (Celebrity Skin). Beyond the Door features nine original songs plus cover versions of the title track from the 1968 Blake Edwards/Peter Sellers comedy The Party and the Sparks 1994 dance hit "When Do I Get to Sing 'My Way'." Bassist Steven McDonald previously played with Sparks on their 2006 album Hello Young Lovers, as well as on the accompanying tour, which also featured Josh Klinghoffer, who plays lead guitar on the track.

Track listing

Personnel
Redd Kross
 Jeff McDonald – vocals, guitar
 Jason Shapiro – lead guitar
 Steven McDonald – bass, backing vocals
 Dale Crover – drums
Guest Musicians
 Buzz Osborne – Guitar solo (track 7)
 Josh Klinghoffer - Lead guitar (track 11)
 Gere Fennelly - Keyboards (track 3)

Production
 Steven McDonald – production, mixing
 Jeff McDonald - production, mixing

References 

2019 albums
Redd Kross albums
Merge Records albums